Lake County is a county in the central portion of the U.S. state of Florida. As of the 2020 census, the population was 383,956. Its county seat is Tavares, and its largest city is Clermont. Lake County is included in the Orlando-Kissimmee-Sanford, FL Metropolitan Statistical Area.

History
Lake County was created in 1887 from portions of Sumter and Orange counties. It was named for the many lakes contained within its borders (250 named lakes and 1,735 other bodies of water).

In the 1800s, the two main industries in the area were growing cotton and breeding cattle. In the latter part of the 19th century, people started to grow citrus trees. Citrus was introduced by Melton Haynes. Throughout the 1940s and 50s, citrus production increased and grew into the area's leading industry. The December 1989 United States cold wave destroyed most of the citrus groves, dealing an economic blow from which many growers could not recover. Grove owners sold massive amounts of land to developers, resulting in increasing urban sprawl.

Geography

Sugarloaf Mountain is the highest point in peninsular Florida, at 312 feet (95 m) above sea level.

Adjacent counties

 Volusia County – northeast
 Orange County – east
 Seminole County – east
 Osceola County – southeast
 Polk County – south
 Sumter County – west
 Marion County – northwest

National protected areas
 Lake Woodruff National Wildlife Refuge (part)
 Ocala National Forest (part)

Demographics

As of the 2020 United States census, there were 383,956 people, 137,446 households, and 94,332 families residing in the county.

As of the census of 2010, there were 297,047 people and 130,190 households residing in the county. The racial makeup of the county was 83.4% White (68.7% non-Hispanic White), 11.5% Black or African American, 0.6% Native American, 2.3% Asian, 0.2% Pacific Islander, and 2.1% from two or more races. 16.7% of the population were Hispanic or Latino of any race.

There were 88,413 households, out of which 23.40% had children under the age of 18 living with them, 58.90% were married couples living together, 8.50% had a female householder with no husband present, and 29.30% were non-families. 24.60% of all households were made up of individuals, and 13.70% had someone living alone who was 65 years of age or older.  The average household size was 2.34 and the average family size was 2.75.

In the county, the population was spread out, with 20.30% under the age of 18, 5.80% from 18 to 24, 23.80% from 25 to 44, 23.80% from 45 to 64, and 26.40% who were 65 years of age or older.  The median age was 45 years. For every 100 females, there were 93.70 males.  For every 100 females age 18 and over, there were 91.10 males.

The median income for a household in the county was $36,903, and the median income for a family was $42,577. Males had a median income of $31,475 versus $23,545 for females. The per capita income for the county was $20,199.  About 6.90% of families and 9.60% of the population were below the poverty line, including 15.80% of those under age 18 and 6.30% of those age 65 or over.

Government
Lake County is represented by U.S. Senators Rick Scott and Marco Rubio, and U.S. Representatives Michael Waltz (R-FL6), Daniel Webster (R-FL11), and Scott Franklin (R-FL15).

In the Florida Senate, Lake County is represented by Senators Dennis Baxley (R-FL12), and Kelli Stargel (R-FL22) . In the Florida House, Lake County is represented by Florida Representatives Keith Truenow (R-FL31), Anthony Sabatini (R-FL32), and Brett Hage (R-FL33).

Lake County has five Constitutional Officers: Gary Cooney (Clerk of the Court and Comptroller), Peyton Grinnell (Sheriff), Cary Baker (Property Appraiser), David Jordan (Tax Collector), and Alan Hays (Supervisor of Elections), and five County Commissioners: Tim Sullivan (R-District 1), Sean Parks (R-District 2), Kirby Smith (R-District 3), Leslie Campione (R-District 4), and Josh Blake (R-District 5).

The Florida Department of Corrections has Region III Correctional Facility Office on the grounds of the Lake Correctional Institution in an unincorporated area in Lake County.

Libraries
The Lake County Library System was established in 1975 following the establishment of the Lake County Library Planning Advisory Board. Today it is governed by the Lake County Board of County Commissioners. The library system is made up of 6 branch libraries and 10 municipal libraries:
 Astor County Library:  at 54905 Alco Road, Astor, FL 32102 
 Cagan Crossings Community Library: Built in 2008; Location: 16729 Cagan Oaks, Clermont, FL 34714
 Cooper Memorial Library: The Cooper Memorial Library's history began in 1905 when a traveling salesman stopped by a boarding house run by the Benjamin McCain family and promised to donate enough books to start a town library if he was able to sell his Chautauqua lectures. Money was contributed, but very few lectures occurred, and books were never donated. Money that was to be used for the final payment for the lecture series was instead used to start a library. The first librarian of the library was Ms. Payson Pierce, who offered her own home for book storage as well as opened her home to the public. In 1914, a permanent structure was built. Women of the Library Club supported the library until 1936 when the Clermont City Council agreed to maintain it. In 2002, Cooper Memorial became a branch of the Lake County Library System.
 East Lake County Library:  at 31340 S. County Road 437, Sorrento, FL 32776
 Eustis Memorial Library, 120 North Center Street, Eustis, Florida 32726 
 Fruitland Park Library: First began in 1916 from the donation of books from the Bosanquet and Dwight families. Twenty years later, under the joint support of the women of St. Paul's Catholic Church, Holy Trinity Episcopal Church, and the Community Methodist Church, it became a community library. In 1970, Fruitland Park Library employed its first salaried librarian.
 Helen Lehmann Memorial Library:  at 17435 Fifth St., Montverde, FL 34756
 Lady Lake Public Library:  at 225 W. Guava St., Lady Lake, FL 32159
 Leesburg Public Library:  at 100 E. Main St., Leesburg, FL 34748
 Marianne Beck Memorial Library: The Marianne Beck Memorial Library began in 1989 as an Eagle Scout project in a former carport in Howey-in-the-Hills, Florida. The local community raised $50,000 to remodel a former convenience store that was purchased by the town for the new library.
 Marion Baysinger Memorial Library:  at 756 W. Broad St., Groveland, FL 34736
 Minneola Schoolhouse Library:  at 100 S. Main Ave., Minneola, FL 34715
 Paisley County Library:  at 24954 County Road 42, Paisley, FL 32767
 Tavares Public Library:  at 314 N. New Hampshire, Tavares, FL 32778
 Umatilla Public Library:  at 412 Hatfield Dr., Umatilla, FL 32784
 W.T. Bland Public Library''':  at 1995 N. Donnelly St., Mount Dora, FL 32757

Elections
Lake County has voted Republican in U.S. presidential races since 1948.

Voter registration
Data comes from the Florida Division of Elections.

Education

There are a number of public schools in the county.

Colleges
The following colleges are in the county:
 Lake-Sumter State College
 Beacon College
 Southern Technical College
 Lake Technical College

Transportation

Aviation
The Tavares Seaplane Base is a city-owned, public-use seaplane base on Lake Dora in Tavares.

The Leesburg International Airport is a former Army Airfield and municipal airport along Lake Harris east of downtown Leesburg, Florida.

Mid Florida Air Service Airport is on State Road 44 east of Eustis.
 Umatilla Municipal Airport

Major highways

  Florida's Turnpike runs north and south from Southeastern and Central Florida. Four interchanges exist in the county; Hancock Road (Exit 278), US 27/SR 19 (Exit 285), southbound US 27 (Exit 289) and County Road 470 (Exit 296).
  US 27 is the main local road through western Lake County, running south to north. It spans from Four Corners to The Villages.
  US 441 is another south to north US highway running through Mount Dora from Orange County around Lake Dora, where it merges with SR 44, has a wrong-way concurrency with SR 19 in Tavares, and lets go of SR 44 in Leesburg only to join US 27 as they both head into Marion County.
  SR 19 is a mostly scenic north and south road from SR 50 in Groveland through Tavares, Eustis, and Ocala National Forest.
  SR 33 is the north–south road from Lakeland in Polk County to Groveland. A county extension exists as a hidden route along SR 50 to Mascotte, where it becomes an exposed county road leading to US 27 in Okahumpka.
  SR 40 is the northernmost east–west route in Lake County, and runs through Ocala National Forest.
  SR 44 runs east and west through Central Lake County from west of Leesburg where it joins southbound US 441 until it breaks away near Mount Dora and heads northeast into Volusia County.
  SR 46 starts at an interchange with US 441 and County Road 46 in Mount Dora and through Sorrento and Mount Plymouth along the northern border of Orange County.
  SR 50 is the main east–west road through southern Lake County.

Public transportation
LakeXpress is the public transportation agency that serves the Lake County, Florida area since 2007.

Communities

Cities

 Clermont
 Eustis
 Fruitland Park
 Groveland
 Leesburg
 Mascotte
 Minneola
 Mount Dora
 Tavares
 Umatilla

Towns
 Astatula
 Howey-in-the-Hills
 Lady Lake
 Montverde

Census-designated places

 Altoona
 Astor
 Ferndale
 Four Corners
 Lake Kathryn
 Lake Mack-Forest Hills
 Lisbon
 Mount Plymouth
 Okahumpka
 Paisley
 Pine Lakes
 Pittman
 Silver Lake
 Sorrento
 Yalaha

Other unincorporated communities

 Bassville Park
 Fort Mason
 Grand Island
 Lanier
 Orange Bend
 The Villages (partly)

Notable people
 Flora Call and Elias Disney were married January 1, 1888, in the Lake County town of Kismet. They were the parents of Walt Disney.
 The Groveland Four (Earnest Thomas, Charles Greenlee, Samuel Shepherd and Walter Irvin), who were falsely accused of raping a 17-year-old white woman and assaulting her husband.
 Willis V. McCall, sheriff of Lake County, who shot one and wounded another of the Groveland Four while they were in his custody
 Randy Rhoads, American heavy metal guitarist, killed in a plane crash in Leesburg on March 19, 1982. Played in the Ozzy Osbourne solo band following his tenure in Quiet Riot.
Ginger Minj, drag queen; best known for being a runner-up on the seventh season of RuPaul's Drag Race and competing on the second season of RuPaul's Drag Race All Stars

See also
 Lake County Schools
 National Register of Historic Places listings in Lake County, Florida

Notes

References

External links

Government links/Constitutional offices
 Lake County Board of County Commissioners
 Lake County Supervisor of Elections
 Lake County Property Appraiser
 Lake County Sheriff's Office
 Lake County Tax Collector

Special districts
 Lake County School Board
 Project Student Safety
 St. Johns River Water Management District
 Southwest Florida Water Management District

Judicial branch
 Lake County Clerk of Circuit and County Courts
  Public Defender, 5th Judicial Circuit of Florida serving Citrus, Hernando, Lake, Marion, and Sumter counties
  Office of the State Attorney, 5th Judicial Circuit of Florida
 5th Judicial Circuit of Florida

Miscellaneous links
 Workforce Central Florida
 Lake County Collection on RICHES Mosaic Interface

 
Florida counties
Populated places established in 1887
Counties in Greater Orlando
1887 establishments in Florida
Randy Rhoads